Łowiczki  is a village in the administrative district of Gmina Zator, within Oświęcim County, Lesser Poland Voivodeship, in southern Poland.

References

Villages in Oświęcim County